Arigidi is a town in Akoko North-West, Ondo State, Nigeria.

Festivals 
There is a festival in honour of the Okota river-goddess from the Yoruba religion. It is sponsored by Oodua People’s Congress under the leadership of Otunba Gani Adams who originates from the village. The Okota Festival is also a celebration of Yoruba culture. Another festival is the Areso Festival.

Political composition
Arigidi has two out of the ten political wards in Akoko North West Local Government namely, Arigidi Iye ward 1 and Agbaluku Imo ward 2. Ward 1 has 24 political units and ward 2 has 11 units, making 34 units in all.

References

Populated places in Ondo State